Uprising 2015 was a professional wrestling supershow co-produced by the British Revolution Pro Wrestling (RPW) and Japanese New Japan Pro-Wrestling (NJPW) promotions. The event was held on October 2, 2015 in the York Hall in Bethnal Green, London, England. The event marked the first collaborative event held by RPW and NJPW.

Background

Production

The event was the first collaborative event held by NJPW and RPW; the two promotions had established a working relationships early in the year as a part of NJPW's "New IWGP Conception." The show was scheduled to featured eight matches, two of which were to be contested for championships.

Results

Aftermath
The following night on October 3, the inaugural Global Wars UK event was held. Global Wars UK has since become an annual tour held by NJPW and RPW.

See also

Professional wrestling in the United Kingdom
List of professional wrestling promotions in Europe

References

New Japan Pro-Wrestling shows
Revolution Pro Wrestling
2015 in professional wrestling
Events in London
October 2015 sports events in the United Kingdom
Professional wrestling in England